Mathematical Grammar School (abbr. "MG" or "MGB"), is a special school for gifted and talented students of mathematics, physics and informatics located in Belgrade, Serbia. It is ranked number one at International Science Olympiads by the number of medals won by its students (more than 400).

The School has developed its own Mathematical Grammar School Curriculum in various mathematics, physics, and IT subjects.
There are approx. 160 professors employed, mostly scientists. One half of the professors come from University of Belgrade staff, Institute of Physics Belgrade, and Mathematical Institute of Serbian Academy of Sciences and Arts. More than half of the professors are former students of the School.

School's staff maintains connections to, collaborates with, and frequently visits world's leading scientific institutions, such as CERN, Joint Institute for Nuclear Research – Dubna, Lomonosov Moscow State University, UC Berkeley, Oxford, Cambridge, Warwick University, Imperial College London.

During the previous decade, students received full scholarships for UC Berkeley, Oxford, Cambridge, Warwick University, Imperial College London, Massachusetts Institute of Technology, MIT, Columbia University, Stanford University, Harvard University, University College London. The rest mostly obtain full scholarships from University of Belgrade.

The School has 550 students, aged 12–19. There are 155 girls, and 395 boys.

The average professors' work experience is 18 years.

Reputation

Mathematical Gymnasium is ranked as number one in the world in the field of mathematics.
The School is famous for its unique results in international competitions and for results its students achieve at later stages of their university education.

The School has approx. 2,000 PhD holders in its alumni, and approx. 6,000 Master of Science degree holders. Its advanced curriculum earned it an esteemed reputation as the breeding ground for future scientists, researchers, and industry leaders.

Mathematical Grammar School is unique for its success in International Science Olympiads in Mathematics, Physics, Informatics, Astronomy, Astrophysics, and Earth Sciences: its students have won more than 400 medals so far, on all 5 continents of the world.

Latest examples include: 12 medals in 2009 in International Science Olympiads only, around 25 medals in total in 2009 alone, 23 medals in 2010 in International Science Olympiads only, around 40 medals in total in 2010 alone.

In 2010, as well as in 2009, Mathematical Gymnasium won the first prize and title of "Absolute Winner" at international competition in Moscow, organized by Special School "Kolmogorov" under Moscow State University – Lomonosov (Специализированный учебно-научный центр Московского государственного университета им.М.В.Ломоносова – Школа им.А.Н.Колмогорова).

The School is ranked as number one school in the world in the field of mathematics, taking the lead from Russian Special School "Kolmogorov", (which operates under Moscow University), and is among the best 5 in physics and in informatics in the world, for its continuous success in International Science Olympiads.

Mathematical Gymnasium stands out with its own curriculum, focusing on natural sciences, especially mathematics, physics, and computer programming.

History 

The School was established in 1966, following the model of Kolmogorov School at Moscow University which had been launched in Moscow a year earlier, in 1965, under Lomonosov Moscow State University, by one of the greatest mathematicians of the 20th century, Andrei Nikolayevich Kolmogorov, and which was later named after him – Kolmogorov School.

In 1977, as part of a statewide education reform in former Yugoslavia, the School was merged into the streamlined secondary education (in Serbian: srednje usmereno obrazovanje), thus cancelling many, but not all, specifics and advantages over other schools. At that time principal, Milan Raspopović was desperately pulling strings in scientific and policy-making community to re-establish special status, special rights, special funding, and special curriculum. As a result, eleven years later, in 1988, the School was officially re-established as a specialized school, this time in the form of experimental education institution. New curriculum was officially published in 1989, in Official Gazette of Socialist Republic of Serbia, no.2, 15 April 1989.

The "experimental status" finally concluded in 1995, when the School was recognized as a "Specialized school for talented/gifted students in mathematics, informatics, physics and other natural sciences" by the Serbian Ministry of Education. At the same time, the School was given the status of a "school of special national importance", as the first school of its kind in Yugoslavia.

Although MGB is formally classified as a special secondary school ("srednja škola", grades nine to twelve in the Serbian education system, for funding and other legal reasons), it enrolls experimental classes of the seventh and eighth grade primary school (age 12 and above). It is the only school in Serbia and in all states formed from former Yugoslavia that has merged elementary school (or part of it) and high school.

Students of Mathematical Grammar School have the highest grade point average (GPA) compared to students from other schools and the same rule applies to their university studies, whether is Serbia or abroad.

See also: Academic grading in Serbia and Education in Serbia.

List of school principals 
The School had 6 principals in its 45 years long history, all of whom are authors of university, high school, and elementary school textbooks and accompanying collections of solved problems and questions. Five principals were mathematicians, and one – and the longest serving principal – was a physicist.

Five MGB principals with Doctor of Sciences titles, and one with Doctor of Science title, earned their degrees at University of Belgrade, and served as university professors and as professors at Mathematical Grammar School.

Competitions 

The School prepares students for various national and international competitions science competitions.  Mathematical Grammar School students had won several hundred medals from top international competitions around the world. They won 121 medals at International Science Olympiads, about the same number at Junior Olympiads, and about double that number at other top competitions, mostly in USSR, Russia, China, India, and Europe.

International Olympiads 
MGB students have won many national and international awards.

Year 2009 
In 2009 only, during July and August, students of Mathematical Grammar School have won 12 medals in International Olympiads: 5 medals in Olympiads in Mathematics, 4 medals in International Physics Olympiad, 3 medals in International Olympiad in Informatics, 3 medals in International Olympiad on Astronomy and Astrophysics, 1 medal and 3 honorable mentions in International Astronomy Olympiad.

Total number of gold, silver and bronze medals, and honorable mentions, won in various international competitions in 2009 is 70.

Year 2010 
At the 2010 International Mathematics Olympiad (5–15 July 2010, Kazakhstan), Serbia was represented by a team of 6 competitors, all 6 students from Mathematical Grammar School, 15–19 years old. The result is Serbia ranks 10th in the world, with 1 gold, 3 silver, and 1 bronze medal won, and the Mathematical Gymnasium school ranks as the best (rank: 1) school among all special and/or regular schools in the world.

In 2010, students of Mathematical Gymnasium have won 28 medals and honorable mentions namely: at 2010 Olympiad in Mathematics (5–15 July 2010, Kazakhstan) 6 medals: 1 gold, 3 silver, 2 bronze; at Euler's Russian Olympiad in Mathematics (24–27 March 2010, Russia), Mathematical Gymnasium was the only non-Russian competitor and its 4-members team won 4 medals: 2 silver and 2 bronze; in highly selective Romanian Master in Mathematics (24 February – 2 March 2010, Romania): 2 silver and 1 bronze medal, and 1 honorable mention (Romanian Master in Mathematics is an olympiad for the selections of the 20 top countries in the last IMO. The level of the competition is IMO-like. The format had been 4 problems in 5 hours in 2009, in 2010 it was changed to 3 problems in 4 hours, two days format.); at XXVII Balkan Mathematical Olympiad (3–8 May, Moldavia) 6 medals: 2 gold, 2 bronze, 2 silver; at International competition "Archimedes" (7–18 June 2010, Bucharest), Mathematical Grammar School won the first place, and its 6 students took 6 medals: 3 gold and 3 silver medals; at XIV Junior Balkan Mathematical Olympiad (18–22 June 2010): 1 silver medal and 1 honorable mention.

Year 2011 

In All Russian Mathematical Competition, organized by the Kolmogorov Special School, Mathematical Grammar School won "The Absolute First Prize in all categories", and one of MGB students, Teodor von Burg, won the gold medal, first prize, and maximum number of points. This is the 2nd time MGB wins the Kolmogorov competition.

Other prizes and awards 

Students of Mathematical Grammar School have won many other prizes in addition to the International Science Olympiads.

As part of the "27 Club", which Erste Bank implemented for the third consecutive year in 2010, with the aim to promote talented young people and help them to get well-deserved public recognition for their work and the results, 2010 year's award winners were declared. In the category of science, the winner of a Grand Prize was Luka Milićević, and the winner of Erste Bank Prize in the field of natural and technical sciences and technology was Dušan Milijančević. Both students are final year students of D-division of Mathematical Grammar School.

At Microsoft's Imagine Cup, students of Mathematical Grammar School were in finals, among top 6 teams in the world.

Other numerous medals from the Balkans Olympiads in Mathematics, Physics and Informatics are being won every year.

Curriculum and core subjects 

Main areas of study are divided into sub-branches or sub-disciplines. Courses are delivered on a per-semester basis.

Mathematics 
Mathematics is divided into fields of Algebra, Geometry, Linear Algebra, Analytical Geometry, Mathematical Analysis, Probability, Statistics, Numerical Analysis, and Selected Chapters in Mathematics.

Physics 
Physics is taught from Newtonian mechanics, Fluid Dynamics, Waves, Optics, Electricity, Magnetism, to modern physics, usually ending with STR, Relativistic Dynamics, Quantum Theory, Quantum Mechanics, Molecular Physics, Physical Chemistry, Atomic Physics, Solid State Physics, Quantum Optics, Nuclear Physics, Nuclear Engineering, Elementary Particle Physics, and introduction to Astrophysics and Cosmology, General Relativity, and some basic introduction to String Theory, Cosmology, and M-Theory.

Informatics and computer science 
There are 5 computer labs in Mathematical Gymnasium, with ca. 110 dual core and quad core computers, and one super-computer.
The School operates its own wireless network. Students gain knowledge in programming languages (Pascal, Delphi, C, C++, C#, Java; Fortran; Prolog), operating systems (Windows, Linux, Unix), databases and DBMS (Oracle Database, Microsoft SQL Server, PostgreSQL, MySQL), and in various IT and ICT fields.

There are 10 two-semester (2×19 weeks) IT courses students must pass during schooling. There is one special (additional) week in each semester, reserved for IT subjects only (so called "block classes"), for students to have lessons only in ICT subjects.

Business and finance 
School offers modules in financial mathematics, as well as in business related studies.

History of school's IT Department 
The first professor of programming in MGB was Ljubomir Protić, professor at University of Belgrade, Faculty of Mathematics, who started teaching programming subjects from school year 1968/69.; 33 years later, professor Protić served as Principal of Mathematical Grammar School (2001–2004).

Later on, many University of Belgrade professors, primarily from Faculty of Mathematics, Faculty of Electrical Engineering, and Faculty of Physics, as well as from Belgrade Institute of Physics and from Vinča Institute of Nuclear Sciences, joined informatics teaching staff at Mathematical Grammar School.

School's IT club 

Programmers club at Faculty of Electrical Engineering  was opened by the MG alumni in 1983, by MG alumnus Dejan Ristanović (graduated in 1981). At the same time was opened Programmers club of Mathematical Grammar School. Dejan Ristanović and MGB alumni founded and run "PC Press" publishing house.

All of part-time ICT teachers and special ICT teachers are former MGB students.

Sports 
Mathematical Grammar School is very proud of success its students achieved throughout the School's 45 years rich history. Trophies won and medals are numerous, and come from many different sport disciplines. The School won Belgrade Trophy in football several times, national high-school championship in basketball, its handball team also won numerous medals. The School have students who trained or train in clubs Red Star and Partizan, to name a few.

School regularly plays and goes to tournaments in volleyball, handball, basketball, and football.

There is an active swimming section each generation have several divers among students.

Students train in karate, taekwondo, judo, and aikido.

There are active badminton and table tennis sections.

Mountaineering, biking, and hiking, are the most popular outdoor activities. Mathematical Grammar School pay special attention to students' needs in the field of sports and recreation and organizes camping trips, recreational gatherings, biking trips, self-defense seminars, and gymnastics days.

Yachting was very popular during eighties and nineties, and the School had national team members who competed around the world.

Graduates and alumni 

From about 8,000 graduates in the 40-year history of this school, more than 400 have obtained PhD degrees and 600 have obtained Magister of Science degrees. These numbers are to be taken with precautions since this is the number of only those who reported their PhD to MG authorities. It is widely believed that much greater number of MG graduates who hold PhDs from western countries never reported their status to MG authorities. MG statistics say the ratio is 1:5, meaning on every 1 alumni that obtains PhD title at Serbian universities there are 5 MG alumni who got their PhD in Western world, mostly at US universities: MIT, UC Berkeley, UCSB, University of Illinois at Urbana–Champaign, Caltech, Cooper Union, and Ivy League universities Columbia, Harvard, Princeton, Brown, the UPenn, Yale, Cornell, and Dartmouth College, Oxford, Cambridge, Imperial College London, University College London, and several other universities (mostly ETH Zurich, EPFL, Lomonosov Moscow State University, and Weizmann Institute of Science in Israel).

MG alumni holds university positions around the globe, but also managerial positions in prestigious world companies, since many of former MG graduates continue careers in business as Executive or Managing Directors of world banks and hold various business diplomas from notable institutions such as Wharton School of the University of Pennsylvania, Harvard Kennedy School, MIT Sloan School of Management, INSEAD, London School of Economics (LSE), Imperial College London, and others. 

More than 99% of the MG graduates hold graduate university Diploma. Almost all of above mentioned 8,000 MG graduates hold at least MSc in either Mathematics, Physics, or Engineering.

Former students of Mathematical Gymnasium are usually employed in special divisions and prepare pupils for international competitions and for entering exams for prestigious universities around the world, usually in UK and USA. Rastko Marinković, Vladimir Baltić, Miljan Knežević, Mladen Laudanović, Velibor Tintor, Vladimir Božin, Igor Devetak, Zlatko Filipović, Miloš Kojašević, Igor Salom, Predrag Milenović, Đorđe Krtinić, are some of the former students that held lectures, guided pupils' graduate theses, mentored special divisions, or prepared competitions and held competition seminars. Đorđe Krinić prepared and led 2010 Serbian Mathematics Olympiad Team, while Vesna Kadelburg, also a former student of Mathematical Gymnasium, led 2010 UK National Team, from her chair at University of Cambridge, where she obtained her PhD.

European Physical Society, in its Euro Physics News Magazine, published an article "Inspiring Physics in Mathematical Grammar School" about Physics teacher Nataša Čaluković from Mathematical Grammar School, and about results of Physics department of MGB. Authors, themselves distinguished physicists from University of Cambridge, Massachusetts Institute of Technology, MIT, and Institute of Physics Belgrade  and former students of Mathematical Grammar School and of professor Nataša Čaluković, claim professor Čaluković's students made 36 appearances at the International Physics Olympiads, and were honored two gold medals, nine silver and twelve bronze medals, as well as ten honorable mentions. Professor Čaluković was herself student of Mathematical Grammar School (graduated 1974), before graduating from the Faculty of Physics, University of Belgrade; as a student of MGB, Nataša's professor and mentor was prof. dr Milan Raspopović, one of the founders of MGB, a physics and philosophy professor, and the longest serving Director and Principal of Mathematical Gymnasium.

Famous alumni also include athletes Slobodan Soro and Rajko Jokanović, chess player Alisa Marić, former Minister of Telecommunications and Information Society in the Government of Serbia Aleksandra Smiljanić, former Mayor of Belgrade Nenad Bogdanović...

Acceptance to UK and USA universities 
Mathematical Grammar School alumni are usually accepted to universities of their choice, because the Curriculum is more advanced and demanding in the fields of mathematics and natural sciences than usual curricula (such as IBO or various national baccalaureates) and MGB students usually have no problem in passing qualification exams and/or interviews.

In 2010 Trinity College, Cambridge awarded 7 full scholarships to 7 pupils from a Special Division (grade 4 division D, or 4-d division) of Mathematical Gymnasium, namely to students Luka Milićević, Dušan Milijančević, Ognjen Ivković, Nikola Mrkšić, Mihajlo Cekić, Aleksandar Vasiljković and Dušan Perović. Trinity College awards, in total, 11 full scholarships per year per non-British citizens, and 2 full scholarships per world region. This is the first time in history of Cambridge that 7 full scholarships were granted not only to one division, not only to one school, not only to one city and not only to one state, but also the first time that this large number of scholarships was awarded to one world region (e.g. North America or Europe are two regions).
The same year, a former pupil, Ivana Milović, was awarded a full scholarship from Trinity College, Cambridge for master studies in mathematics. More pupils from MG were accepted to Cambridge, but there were no more full scholarships. Other students received scholarships from MIT and other UK and USA faculties and universities. This trend of enrolment of MG students at Cambridge continued in the following years, with MG graduates Ognjen Marković and Luka Ribar gaining full scholarships in 2011, and Nevena Nikolić, Igor Spasojević, Dušan Šobot, Tamara Šumarac and Petar Veličković in 2012.

Some students win more than one full scholarship. Notable examples are 2010 graduates Dušan Milijančević, who got full scholarships from University of Cambridge and from Massachusetts Institute of Technology, MIT and Nataša Dragović, who got full scholarships from University of Oxford and from MIT.

Diploma relative value 
MG graduate Diploma alone is treated as "Associate Degree" in named field, be it nuclear engineering, mathematics and IT, laser physics, or any other of 20 or so fields present in MG during its 40 years existence. However, due to old legal regulations in Serbia, graduates of MG are still obliged to start their university studies from year 1, even though many of university subjects are taught throughout MGB 6 years course (e.g. probability theory, statistics, mathematical analysis, numerical analysis, combinatorics, number theory, geometry, linear algebra, analytical geometry, algebra, various advanced physics topics such as atomic, solid state and nuclear physics). When leaving abroad for studies, MG graduates usually graduate faster than their peers (e.g. Ranko Lazić left MGB after 2nd grade (out of 4) to enroll to University of Oxford. He is now professor at University of Oxford and at University of Warwick).

Collaboration 
Matematička gimnazija collaborates with the highest ranking scientific institutions in Serbia and abroad. Collaboration is defined through various agreements on scientific, technical and educational cooperation.

Cooperation and financial support 

Mathematical Gymnasium also have contracts with JAT Airways (national air-traffic company), Telekom Srbija (Telecom Serbia, the largest telecom operator in former Yugoslavia and in modern Serbia), Serbian Academy of Sciences and Arts, domestic and international scientific Institutes, etc.

Ministry of Science and Technology is one of a large scale investors in Mathematical Grammar School. Its current Minister and Deputy Prime Minister Božidar Đelić is a frequent guest in the School. This does not come as a surprise, since there are so many international competitions where MGB students regularly win medals.

Đelić served 3 times as Minister of Finance and 2 times as Minister of Science and Technology. He also serves as Deputy Prime Minister, and Minister for European Union affairs. During all his mandates, Mathematical Grammar School enjoyed financial and technical support of Ministries he led. During his visit to MGB Physics Lab 1, Mr. Đelić said he sees MGB students and alumni as "the best ambassadors of Serbia and of Serbian and world science". He said he appreciates top achievements in education, since he himself won French national competitions for high-school students in history and economics in 1980 and 1981, and was educated at the Institut d'études politiques de Paris and later École des Hautes Études Commerciales in Paris where he graduated as a top student. In 1987 he received a double master's degree in economics at the Ecole des Hautes Etudes en Sciences Sociales. He eventually moved to the United States, where he completed a Master of Business Administration at the Harvard Business School, as well as a Master of Public Administration, specializing in macroeconomics and international relations, at Harvard Kennedy School. His mentors were Alain Gomez, the chairman of Thomson SA, who taught him how to be a manager, and the economist Jeffrey Sachs, who took him along from Harvard to Warsaw and Moscow. Mr. Đelić promised Ministry of Science and Technology will continue to invest in MGB and expressed his personal wish that alumni of Mathematical Grammar School start returning to Belgrade and Serbia at least at the rate MGB graduates leave the country.

Enrollment 

Mathematical Grammar School has built a reputation as an elite school throughout its 45 years of existence, with significant world stage highlights at the end of 1980s and during the 1990s, which led to increased number of candidates applying every year. Eventually the number of applicants far outnumbered the number of available spaces. Paid classes were introduced in 1997 for students whose parents were willing and able to pay for their education. This practice has continued since, enabling the School to keep its high teaching standards through budget improvements. Basic fees are 10,000 euros per year.

The School currently has four high-school grades (nine to twelve, or high school grades one to four), and two elementary-school grades (seven and eight; elementary school starts from grade zero). Due to recent changes in general law governing all public schools and institutions, all high-school classes are now financed by the state.

To successfully enroll in the high school classes, candidates have to pass a special mathematics entrance exam, different from the statewide high-school mathematics entrance exam. Candidates are ranked according to the total score that combines result achieved at special MGB entrance exam (maximum of 120 points) and performance from previous elementary-school grades (maximum of 60 points). Preference is given to outstanding achievers at competitions and recipients of national prizes during the previous years of their education.

The ranking process for candidates enrolling in the elementary school classes is similar, with mathematics entrance exam (max. 120 points), performance from the previous grades in school (max. 60 points), and awards from state competitions in mathematics, physics, chemistry, or informatics (120 points).

State-controlled education in Serbia is free of charge, so there are no official enrollment fees, except the exam costs.

Distinguished guests 

Mathematical Grammar School has been visited by many distinguished guests. Among notable guests outside the world of mathematics, physics and informatics, were, during last 5 years only (i.e. after 2005), among many others:
 then Serbian Prime Minister Zoran Đinđić,
 Serbian President Boris Tadić,
 then Belgrade Mayor Nenad Bogdanović, himself alumnus of MGB,
 then Serbian Prime Minister Vojislav Koštunica,
 Serbian Patriarch Pavle,
 Serbian Patriarch Irinej,
 Alexander, Crown Prince of Yugoslavia,
 Katherine, Crown Princess of Yugoslavia,
 Kim Young-Hee, Ambassador of the Republic of Korea.

On Monday, 21 June 2010, Michael O'Sullivan, Director of the Cambridge Commonwealth Trust paid visit to Mathematical Grammar School. O'Sullivan was greeted by Principal Srdjan Ognjanovic, Zoran Kadelburg, a professor of Mathematical Analysis, and MGB students who will continue their education in Cambridge. This event was recorded by the Radio Television of Serbia.

The cause for O'Sullivan's visit was that in 2009 16 students of Mathematical Grammar School were admitted to University of Cambridge. Two were female, and both received full scholarship from Trinity College, Cambridge, while in 2010 15 students enrolled in Cambridge, 7 of whom received full scholarships from Trinity College. Policy of scholarship granting of Trinity College of University of Cambridge allows maximum of 2 full scholarships per world regions (such as North America, or Europe, or Africa, or Indochina, etc.), and Mathematical Grammar School excellent score caused exceptions in Trinity's policy year by year, and caused O'Sullivan to pay a visit to MGB.

Legal status 
The School operates as a public school and acts as a member of Serbian education system, which is governed by the Ministry of Education.

Formally a part of former Yugoslav and now Serbian state educational system (i.e. financed by the state), Mathematical Grammar School had a status of "experimental school", which allowed it to operate autonomously since its foundation.

It has fundings independent from general high school fundings and is helped both by the state and by the University of Belgrade. University pay scale applies to all employees.

Mathematical Grammar School has the following legal statuses:

 "Experimental school whose aim is to reinforce mathematical education for students which show a special gift for mathematics and natural sciences", according to the decision of the Educational Council of SR Serbia (Decision no. 110-32/89 from 18 January 1989);
 "School for talented students in the areas of mathematics and natural sciences", according to the decision of the Ministry of Education of Serbia;
 "School of special national interest", according to the decision of the Government of the Republic of Serbia. (please see picture on the right)

Teaching positions 

Teaching position in Mathematical Gymnasium comprises a timetable of 18 hours per week for "ordinary professors", and up to 12 hours of teaching for "special professors" (usually called "special teachers") in special divisions (usually university employed staff, or institute researchers, former MG students from special divisions, many still studying at university level).

There is no institution of Qualified Teacher Status (QTS) in Serbia, other than university diploma in appropriate scientific field. Since MG curriculum is scientifically much more demanding than international curricula (such as International Baccalaureate), it is school's policy to appoint professors mostly from former MG graduates, themselves holders of various awards from domestic and international competitions.

MGB teachers usually collaborate on international scientific programs and, from time to time, publish specialized textbooks for use in Mathematical Gymnasium.

Most of the textbooks in mathematics and ICT, and all of the textbooks in physics, used in elementary and high schools in Serbia, are written by professor of Mathematical Grammar School.

Teaching staff 
Mathematical Gymnasium usually employs former students of the School as "special teachers", many of whom are still students or graduate students, to work in special divisions (of which are most respected A- and world known D-divisions).

"Lead Teacher", "Head Teacher", and Principal titles and responsibilities are held by professors (teachers) who are former MGB students. Teachers with higher rank are commonly referred as "special teachers", since they teach to special divisions. (Although all divisions of Mathematical Grammar School are special divisions, A- and D- divisions are "more special" than others, thus have internally reserved the term "special" for themselves.)

In the current full-time engaged school staff, 23 teachers hold Doctor of Sciences degrees, 17 either PhD, Magister of Science, or MA degrees, and all the rest hold graduated or MSc degrees; other PhD and MSc degree holders, University professors and assistants, or Institute assistant researchers, usually teach in special divisions.

The department of Mathematics has 33 full-time professors, of which 15 teachers hold Doctor of Sciences degrees, 8 hold PhD or Magister of Science, 1 holds MA, 1 holds Master of Science degree, and 8 are postgraduate students. 22 of the mentioned 33 full-time professors of Mathematics are former students of Mathematical Gymnasium.

Experimental teaching methods and programs prevail in the School. Many classes are taught by University of Belgrade professors and research assistants from the Faculty of Mathematics, Faculty of Physics, Belgrade Institute of Physics – Zemun , Institute for Nuclear Sciences Vinča, and Faculty of Electrical Engineering, and teaching methods vary according to professors' styles.

Average experience of teaching staff 
The average teaching experience of professors in Mathematical Grammar School is 18 years.

The rest are teachers from university and institutes with similar age / work experience distribution.

Building and facilities 
Mathematical Gymnasium's main building has 2,144.98 m2 area, not including basement labs.

It has 11 specialized cabinets (5 for informatics related subjects, 2 for physics, 1 for mathematics, 1 for chemistry, 1 for biology, 1 for foreign languages), 1 server room with equipment for administration of over 100 LAN and WLAN stations in the School, 13 large classrooms, 3 smaller and isolated classrooms for mentor teaching and competition preparation, Assembly Hall, Ceremonial Hall, library with over 10,000 books and textbooks, mediatheque, basement laboratories, cabinets for teaching staff, administrative staff, cleaning staff, secretary cabinet, accounting department, copy center, psychologist office, Vice Principal Office, and Principal Office.

Location 
Mathematical Grammar School is located in Kraljice Natalije Street 37 (formerly Narodnog Fronta 37), in the centre of the city of Belgrade, neighboring National Assembly Building, Presidential Palace, City Hall and Mayor's Office. It is surrounded by Government of Serbia official buildings, Ministry of Foreign Affairs, and Russian Center.

References 

Education in Belgrade
Buildings and structures in Belgrade
Gymnasiums in Belgrade
Schools of mathematics
Educational institutions established in 1966